Milano is a collaborative studio album by Italian composer Daniele Luppi and American rock band Parquet Courts. Produced by Luppi, it was released on October 27, 2017 on 30th Century Records and Columbia Records, and features several lead vocal contributions from Yeah Yeah Yeahs' singer Karen O.

It is a concept album, complete with songs that are fictionalized stories about misfits, fashionistas, outcasts and junkies in mid-1980s Milan. Daniele teamed up with Parquet Courts and Yeah Yeah Yeahs vocalist Karen O to help deliver his vision of an emerging youth culture struggling to be heard amidst the rapid gentrification of old Milan. The song "Soul and Cigarette" is a tribute to Milanese poet Alda Merini.

Critical reception
Reviewing in his Substack-published "Consumer Guide" column, Robert Christgau regarded the album as a minor work dominated by Andrew Savage's "clever" lyrics and vocal performance.

Track listing

References

2017 albums
Columbia Records albums
Parquet Courts albums